The term Marker may refer to:

Common uses
 Marker (linguistics), a morpheme that indicates some grammatical function
 Marker (telecommunications), a special-purpose computer
 Boundary marker, an object that identifies a land boundary
 Marker or Clapperboard, equipment used during filming
 Marker, a set of sewing patterns placed over cloth to be cut
 Historical marker, a plaque erected at historically significant locations
 Marker pen, a felt-tipped pen
 Paintball marker, or paintball gun, an air gun
 Survey marker, an object placed to mark a point

Places
 4253 Märker, a main belt asteroid
 Marker, Norway, a municipality in Østfold county, Norway

People
 Chris Marker (1921–2012), French film maker and director of La jetée
 Cliff Marker (1903–1972), American football player
 Friedrich Märker (1893–1985), German writer, essayist, theatre critic and publicist
 Gary Marker, American bass guitarist and recording engineer
 Gus Marker (1905–1997), Canadian ice hockey player
 Harry Marker (1899 – 1990), American filmmaker
 James Marker (c. 1920–2012), American-born Canadian businessman who invented Cheezies
 Jamsheed Marker (born 1922), Pakistani diplomat
 Nicky Marker (born 1965), English footballer and coach
 Peter Marker, Australian Australian rules footballer and media personality
 Russell Earl Marker (1902–1995), American chemist
 Steve Marker (born 1959), American musician and record producer, guitarist for Garbage
 Vic Marker (fl. 1937–1939), American boxer
 Voris (designer), née Voris Marker (1908-1973), American fashion designer and sculptor

Arts, entertainment, and media
 Marker (band), a band formed in 2017 by Ken Vandermark
 Marker (novel), a 2005 novel by Robin Cook
 Marker (TV series), a 1995 American drama series
 The Marker (film), a 2017 British crime film
 TheMarker, an Israeli Hebrew-language daily business newspaper
 Pistol Whipped (working title: Marker), a 2008 film starring Steven Seagal
 Marker, a business website published by Medium

Companies
 Marker (ski bindings), a company specializing in ski bindings

Science
 Biological marker, or biomarker, a substance used as an indicator of a biological state
 Genetic marker, a DNA sequence with a known location associated with a particular gene or trait

See also
 Mark (disambiguation)
 Markup (disambiguation)
 Marker, Russian combat UGV